Colin Ebelthite and Jaroslav Pospíšil were the defending champions, but lost in the semifinals this year.
Nikola Ćirić and Goran Tošić won the final 7–6(7–0), 7–5 against Mate Pavić and Franko Škugor.

Seeds

Draw

Draw

References
 Main Draw

ATP Challenger Trophy - Doubles
2012 Doubles